Meir Cohen (born 8 June 1972 in Israel) is an Israeli retired football player.

Honours
Liga Leumit:
Winner (1): 2002–03
Runner-up (3): 1993–94, 2006–07, 2010–11
Liga Alef:
Winner (1): 1992-93

External links
Stats at ONE 
 

1972 births
Living people
Israeli footballers
Israeli football managers
Hapoel Beit She'an F.C. players
Maccabi Herzliya F.C. players
Bnei Sakhnin F.C. players
Maccabi Ahi Nazareth F.C. players
Hapoel Nir Ramat HaSharon F.C. players
Hapoel Rishon LeZion F.C. players
Maccabi Umm al-Fahm F.C. players
Hapoel Nof HaGalil F.C. players
Hapoel Afula F.C. players
F.C. Tzeirei Kafr Kanna players
Hapoel Asi Gilboa F.C. players
Footballers from Beit She'an
Association football goalkeepers
Israeli Premier League players
Liga Leumit players
Israeli people of Moroccan-Jewish descent